Giovanni Pipino may refer to:

 Giovanni Pipino da Barletta (died 1316), an Italian nobleman and dignitary of the Kingdom of Naples
 Giovanni Pipino di Altamura (died 1357), an Italian nobleman and condottiero of the Kingdom of Naples